In the Border States is a 1910 American drama film directed by  D. W. Griffith. Prints of the film survive in the film archives of the Museum of Modern Art and the Library of Congress.

Cast
 Charles West as Young Father
 Charles Arling
 William J. Butler as Confederate Soldier
 Verner Clarges as Union Officer
 Edward Dillon as Confederate Soldier
 John T. Dillon as Union Soldier (as Jack Dillon)
 Gladys Egan as Younger Sister
 Frank Evans as Confederate Soldier
 Francis J. Grandon as Surgeon
 Guy Hedlund as Confederate Soldier
 Dell Henderson as Union Officer
 Henry Lehrman as Union Soldier
 W. Chrystie Miller as Grandfather at Farewell
 Owen Moore
 Alfred Paget as Union Soldier
 Mack Sennett as Union Soldier
 Henry B. Walthall as Confederate Corporal
 Dorothy West as Union Maiden at Farewell

See also
 List of American films of 1910

References

External links

 In the Border States on YouTube
 In The Border States available for free download at Internet Archive

1910 films
1910 short films
1910 drama films
Silent American drama films
American Civil War films
American silent short films
American black-and-white films
Films directed by D. W. Griffith
Films shot in New Jersey
Articles containing video clips
Films with screenplays by Stanner E.V. Taylor
1910s American films